James Robert Alexander Chalmers (born September 1974) is an English actor who has performed in film, television and theatre. Chalmers graduated from the University of Edinburgh and continued his training at the London Academy of Music and Dramatic Art. He first performed with the Royal Shakespeare Company in Spanish Golden Age productions and made his West End debut when the season transferred to the Playhouse Theatre in 2005. He has performed with Shakespeare's Globe and the Read Not Dead project, Royal Court Theatre, Northcott Theatre, Royal National Theatre (studio), Theatre503, and the Park Theatre (London).

Early life 
Chalmers was educated at Eagle House School in Berkshire and Bradfield College. He went on to study at the University of Edinburgh from 1994 to 1998, where he was awarded a BSc in Civil Engineering. He then trained at the London Academy of Music and Dramatic Art (LAMDA), London, where fellow students included Daisy Haggard and Benedict Cumberbatch, graduating in 2000.

Selected career

Film 
In 2008 he was main cast in the British zombie movie Within The Woods directed by Luke Massey. In 2019 he was main cast in the independent feature film Kill Ben Lyk.

Television 
In 2006 he guest starred in The Bill as Environmental Protection Officer Alistair Maddison. In 2008 he guest starred in the Casualty as the scam artist Steve Denver. In 2020 he played the role of William Ponsonby (British Army officer) in Belgravia (TV series). In 2022 he played the role of George in Midnight at the Pera Palace on Netflix.

Theatre 
He is most known on stage, for his role in Tamar's Revenge (by Tirso de Molina 2004) performed by the Royal Shakespeare Company, where he played the lead role of Absalom. In that season he also appeared in Pedro, the Great Pretender (by Miguel de Cervantes), Dog in a Manger (by Lope De Vega), and House of Desires (by Sor Juana Ines de la Cruz).

In 2016 he appeared in The Patriotic Traitor with Tom Conti and Laurence Fox, written and directed by Jonathan Lynn.

Filmography

Film

Television

Theatre

Selected Stage Credits

References

External links

1974 births
British male stage actors
Alumni of the University of Edinburgh
Alumni of the London Academy of Music and Dramatic Art
Living people
People educated at Bradfield College
People educated at Eagle House School
British male television actors
English male film actors
English male stage actors
English male Shakespearean actors
21st-century English male actors
English male television actors
Royal Shakespeare Company members